Jack Gordon Westrope (January 18, 1918 – June 19, 1958) was an American Hall of Fame jockey in Thoroughbred horse racing.

Born in Baker, Montana, Westrope was the son of racehorse owner/trainer W. T. Westrope. Jack was only 12 years old when he rode his first winner, on a small track in Lemmon, South Dakota. By age 15, while still officially an apprentice jockey, he was the leading rider in the U.S. for 1933. Westrope scored 301 victories from the 1,224 races he competed in that year, giving him a 25% win rate, the highest for any national title holder during the past twenty-four years.

Although based on the West Coast of the United States, Jack Westrope won races across the United States and in Cuba. During his career, he rode 2,467 winners including in numerous important graded stakes races such as the Santa Anita Derby, Blue Grass Stakes, and the Hollywood Gold Cup.

During the running of the 1958 Hollywood Oaks at Hollywood Park Racetrack in Inglewood, California, Westrope was severely injured when he was thrown from Well Away, his horse, and died in hospital a few hours later. He was survived by his second wife Terry, daughters Jackie and Jill,  and daughters Pamela and Jan from his first marriage, to actress Nan Grey. He is buried in the Forest Lawn Memorial Park Cemetery in Glendale.

Westrope lived for a time next door to Oliver Hardy.

For his contribution to the sport, Jack Westrope was inducted posthumously into the National Museum of Racing and Hall of Fame in 2002.

References

1918 births
1958 deaths
American Champion jockeys
American jockeys
Burials at Forest Lawn Memorial Park (Glendale)
Jockeys who died while racing
People from Baker, Montana
Sports deaths in California
United States Thoroughbred Racing Hall of Fame inductees